Settat is a province of Morocco in the Casablanca-Settat Region. The province had a population of 956,904 people in 2004.

The Wali (governor) of the region is Bouchaib El Moutawakkil. The major cities and towns are:
Ben Ahmed
El Borouj
Guisser
Loulad
Oulad M'Rah
Oulad Said
Ras El Ain
Settat

Subdivisions
The province is divided administratively into the following:

References

 
Settat
Geography of Casablanca-Settat